In mathematics, a band (also called idempotent semigroup) is a semigroup in which every element is idempotent (in other words equal to its own square). Semilattices, left-zero bands, right-zero bands, rectangular bands, normal bands, left-regular bands, right-regular bands and regular bands, specific subclasses of bands that lie near the bottom of this lattice, are of particular interest and are briefly described below.

Varieties of bands
A class of bands forms a variety if it is closed under formation of subsemigroups, homomorphic images and direct product. Each variety of bands can be defined by a single  defining identity.

Semilattices
Semilattices are exactly commutative bands; that is, they are the bands satisfying the equation

Bands induce a preorder that may be defined as  if and only if  . Requiring commutativity implies that this preorder becomes a (semilattice) partial order.

Zero bands
A left-zero band is a band satisfying the equation
 ,
whence its Cayley table has constant rows.

Symmetrically, a right-zero band is one satisfying
 ,
so that the Cayley table has constant columns.

Rectangular bands
A rectangular band is a band  that satisfies

  for all , or equivalently, 
  for all ,

In any semigroup the first identity is sufficient to characterize a Nowhere commutative semigroup.

Nowhere commutative semigroup implies the first identity. 

In any flexible magma  so every element commutes with its square. So in any Nowhere commutative semigroup every element is idempotent thus any Nowhere commutative semigroup is in fact a Nowhere commutative band. 

Thus in any Nowhere commutative semigroup

In a any semigroup the first identity implies idempotence since  so  so idempotent (a band). Then 

nowhere commutative since a band  So in a band

In any semigroup the first identity also implies the second because .

The idempotents of a rectangular semigroup form a sub band that is a rectangular band but a rectangular semigroup may have elements that are not idempotent. In a band the second identity obviously implies the first but that requires idempotence. There exist semigroups that satisfy the second identity but are not bands and do not satisfy the first.

There is a complete classification of rectangular bands.

 

  and likewise
 
 
These two magma identities  
 
 and  

 are together equivalent to the second characteristic identity above.
The two together also imply associativity . Any magma that satisfies these two rectangular identities and idempotence is therefore a rectangular band. So any magma that satisfies both the characteristic identities (four separate magma identities) is a band and therefore a rectangular band.

The magma operation defined above is a rectangular band because for any pair  we have  so every element is idempotent and the first characteristic identity follows from the second together with idempotence. 

But a magma that satisfies only the identities for the first characteristic and idempotence need not be associative so the second characteristic only follows from the first in a semigroup.

Any rectangular band is isomorphic to one of the above form (either  is empty, or pick any element , and then defines an isomorphism ).  Left-zero and right-zero bands are rectangular bands, and in fact every rectangular band is isomorphic to a direct product of a left-zero band and a right-zero band. All rectangular bands of prime order are zero bands, either left or right. A rectangular band is said to be purely rectangular if it is not a left-zero or right-zero band.

This implies not only that every nonempty rectangular band is isomorphic to one coming from a pair of sets, but also these sets are uniquely determined up to a canonical isomorphism, and all homomorphisms between bands come from pairs of functions between sets. This is why the above result only gives an equivalence between nonempty rectangular bands and pairs of nonempty sets.

Normal bands
A normal band is a band  satisfying

We can also say  a normal band is a band  satisfying

This is the same equation used to define medial magmas, and so a normal band may also be called a medial band, and normal bands are examples of medial magmas.

Left-regular bands

A left-regular band is a band  satisfying

  for all ,

If we take a semigroup and define   if and only if , we obtain a partial ordering if and only if this semigroup is a left-regular band.  Left-regular bands thus show up naturally in the study of posets.

Right-regular bands

A right-regular band is a band  satisfying

  for all 

Any right-regular band becomes a left-regular band using the opposite product.  Indeed, every variety of bands has an 'opposite' version; this gives rise to the reflection symmetry in the figure below.

Regular bands
A regular band is a band  satisfying
  for all

Lattice of varieties

When partially ordered by inclusion, varieties of bands naturally form a lattice, in which the meet of two varieties is their intersection and the join of two varieties is the smallest variety that contains both of them. The complete structure of this lattice is known; in particular, it is countable, complete, and distributive.  The sublattice consisting of the 13 varieties of regular bands is shown in the figure.  The varieties of left-zero bands, semilattices, and right-zero bands are the three atoms (non-trivial minimal elements) of this lattice.

Each variety of bands shown in the figure is defined by just one identity.  This is not a coincidence: in fact, every variety of bands can be defined by a single identity.

See also
Boolean ring, a ring in which every element is (multiplicatively) idempotent
Nowhere commutative semigroup
Special classes of semigroups
Orthodox semigroup

Notes

References
.
.
.
.
.
.
.
.
.
.

Algebraic structures
Semigroup theory